Paul Meyer may refer to:

 Paul Meyer (clarinetist) (born 1965), French clarinetist
 Paul Meyer (philologist) (1840–1917), French philologist
 Paul Meyer (rower) (born 1922), Swiss rower
 Paul Meyer (sport shooter) (born 1961), Zimbabwean sports shooter
 Sgt. Paul Meyer, aircraft mechanic who stole a Lockheed C-130 in 1969

See also
 Paul Mayer (disambiguation)
 Paul Meyers (1895–1966), football player
 Paul Meier (disambiguation)